Richard O'Sullivan (born 7 May 1944) is an English comedy actor, who is known for his role as Robin Tripp in the 1970s sitcoms Man About the House (1973–1976) and Robin's Nest (1977–1981) and as the title character in the period family adventure series Dick Turpin (1979–1982). He also starred in Doctor at Large (1971), Doctor in Charge (1972–1973), Alcock and Gander (1972), Me and My Girl (1984–1988) and Trouble In Mind (1991).

Early life
O'Sullivan was born in 1944, to John and Ellen O'Sullivan (née Fleming) in Chiswick. His early education was at St John the Evangelist's RC Primary School in Brentford, West London .  After a family holiday in Ireland as a boy, he returned with a strong Irish accent and was sent to the Corona Theatre School to soften it. He appeared in his first film at the age of eight.

Career as child actor
O'Sullivan's first film appearance was as an extra playing one of the children singing in the Sunday School sequence of The Yellow Balloon, filmed in 1952 when he was eight years old and released in 1953. He then played the main character in The Stranger's Hand, starring Alida Valli and Trevor Howard, in 1953. 
Possibly his earliest television work was the part he played in the Sherlock Holmes episode, "The Unlucky Gambler", broadcast on 18 July 1955. He appeared in the Children's Film Foundation's first serial, Raiders of the River, also produced in 1955. In the film It's Great to Be Young (1956), he appeared alongside John Mills. The following year, he played the title character in a BBC Television five part Sunday serial Little Lord Fauntleroy and then with Keith Michell and Belinda Lee in the opulent swashbuckler, Dangerous Exile, playing Louis XVII, the ten-year-old son of Louis XVI and Marie Antoinette. Also during that period, he featured in two episodes of Sapphire Films' The Adventures of Robin Hood (1957) alongside Richard Greene, one role being that of Will Dale in the episode "The Challenge of the Black Knight".  In the Sword of Freedom series (1957), also made by Sapphire, he played Alberto in the episode "Chart of Gold". In an early Carry On film, Carry On Teacher (1959), he had the small role of student Robin Stevens. Around the same time, he was cast in the role of Pierre van der Mal in an early scene of The Nun's Story (also 1959), playing the younger brother of Gabrielle (Audrey Hepburn). Also around that time, he had a leading role in an episode of the Sapphire/ITC series The Four Just Men ("The Man with the Golden Touch", 1959), as Neapolitan street urchin Pietro, who foils a robbery.

Adult acting career
In the early 1960s, O'Sullivan appeared in two Cliff Richard films: The Young Ones (1961), and Wonderful Life (1964). In the 1963 blockbuster Cleopatra, he appeared as Pharaoh Ptolemy XIII, the younger brother of the title character played by Elizabeth Taylor.

For the remainder of the 1960s, O'Sullivan was a jobbing actor appearing in such TV series as Dr Syn: the Scarecrow, Emergency Ward 10, Redcap, Danger Man, No Hiding Place, Dixon of Dock Green and Strange Report among others, until he was offered the role of Lawrence Bingham in the LWT sitcom Doctor at Large (1971), a role which continued in the later Doctor in Charge (1972–73). Meanwhile, he also had a main role in the Thames Television comedy Alcock and Gander (1972) with Beryl Reid. 

By then a regular in TV sitcoms, he starred as Robin Tripp, a trainee chef, in the flatshare sitcom Man About the House written by Johnnie Mortimer and Brian Cooke, launched in 1973.

In 1975, he starred in the stage comedy Boeing Boeing, undertaking two record-breaking national tours, alongside two of his Man About The House co-stars, Yootha Joyce and Sally Thomsett. 

When the television series ended in 1976, he continued playing Robin Tripp in the spin-off sitcom Robin's Nest, in which Robin sets up a bistro with funding from his girlfriend Vicky's father, James Nicholls (Tony Britton). During his run as Robin, he had relationships with two of his co-stars, Sally Thomsett from Man About the House, and Tessa Wyatt, who played Vicky in Robin's Nest. From the latter relationship, he had a son, Jamie.

Robin's Nest was a big success, and was the first UK sitcom to feature an unmarried couple cohabiting. To tie in with the series, O'Sullivan wrote a recipe book called Man About the Kitchen, which was published in 1980. He also wrote the Robin's Nest theme tune, which was arranged by Brian Bennett. During that period, O'Sullivan also appeared in adverts for British Gas.

In 1979, he starred in the title role of LWT's drama series Dick Turpin, which ran until 1982. He then played the widower Simon Harrup in the sitcom Me and My Girl, broadcast from 1984 to 1988, co-starring Tim Brooke-Taylor and Joan Sanderson, also produced by LWT. He also appeared in a one-off comedy-drama The Giftie, shown on Channel Four in 1988, in which he and a friend discovered a photocopier at work that could duplicate living copies of themselves, unwisely doing so, and predictably leading to mistaken identities and chaos. In the 1990s, his profile decreased although he was never short of work. His final acting role was in a 1996 one-off satire titled Holed, with Tony Robinson, about a suburban golf club.

Later life
O'Sullivan largely retired from public life in 1996. His last appearance on television was as a guest on a 1999 edition of This Is Your Life held in honour of his Doctor... co-star George Layton. O'Sullivan had himself been the subject of the show in 1974. In 2006, O'Sullivan recorded a commentary for the DVD release of Carry On Teacher. 

He has lived in Brinsworth House, a retirement home for entertainers in Twickenham, since suffering a stroke in 2003.

Filmography

Film

Television

References

External links
 

1944 births
Living people
English male child actors
English male film actors
English male television actors
English people of Irish descent
Male actors from London
People from Chiswick
20th-century English male actors